Ilancheran, better known as Lollu Sabha Maaran, is an Indian actor and comedian known for his work in Tamil films. He became a well-known face when he started acting in the television show Comedy Bazaar, which aired on Jaya TV.

Career 
He started his career as an art director for television shows. After that, he got a chance to work with the television shows Comedy Bazaar and Lollu Sabha and to play a supporting role in the Student Number 1 movie. In 2014, after acting in C. S. Amudhan's Rendavathu Padam, he tried to become a director, but due to financial problems, he approached his friend Santhanam to refer a producer. However, at the time, the Lollu Sabha duo Muruganand (Murugan and Prem Anand) were making their debut as film directors with the film Inimey Ippadithan. They asked him to help with the additional improvements to the dialogues, so he worked on that film. In 2016, his friend Mahendran Rajamani also started making a film named Enakku Vaaitha Adimaigal, so he asked Maaran to work on his debut film, so he acted in the film and also wrote the lyrics for the film. After that, he started to act in small roles that were offered by his friend Santhanam. In 2021, Dikkiloona was released on ZEE5. The film received mostly negative reviews, and the dialogues of Maaran were praised. And then he got chances to work on projects like Naai Sekar, Kaathuvaakula Rendu Kaadhal, J Baby, and Naai Sekar Returns.

Filmography

As actor 

 All films are in Tamil, unless otherwise noted.

Films

Television

As lyricist

Controversy 
In May 2021, actor Manimaran died due to a coronavirus infection. Some print and media posted a photo of Lollu Saba Maaran and published the news. Maaran then explained via video that he was fine and that all people should be aware of Coronavirus.

References

External links 

 

Year of birth missing (living people)
Indian actors
Tamil comedians
Male actors from Chennai
Male actor filmographies
Tamil male actors
Tamil male television actors
Television personalities from Tamil Nadu
Male actors from Tamil Nadu
Male actors in Tamil cinema
21st-century Tamil male actors
Indian male comedians